Leyre Monente Aicua (born 15 February 2000) is a Spanish footballer who plays as a forward or attacking midfielder for Athletic Club.

Having made her Primera División debut aged 16 in 2016, her early career was disrupted by serious injuries, including a torn anterior cruciate ligament plus other issues in 2017 which kept her out for more than a year, and a shoulder problem which required surgery in late 2019 but then recurred in 2021, just after she had re-established herself in the Athletic squad and been confirmed as having moved up from the B-team on a permanent basis. She finally made a first appearance of the 2021–22 season as a substitute against Valencia on 2 April 2022.

Monente was selected for the Spain age-group squads that won the UEFA Women's Under-17 Championship in 2015 and finished runners-up in 2016; she also claimed a bronze medal at the 2016 FIFA U-17 Women's World Cup.

Her experiences with injuries and the enforced breaks from playing led her to pursue a course in physiotherapy as a possible future career.

References

External links
 
 
 
 

2000 births
Living people
Sportspeople from Logroño
Footballers from La Rioja (Spain)
Spanish women's footballers
Women's association football forwards
Women's association football midfielders
EdF Logroño players
Athletic Club Femenino B players
Athletic Club Femenino players
Segunda Federación (women) players
Primera División (women) players
Spain women's youth international footballers